Norway participated in the ninth Winter Paralympics in Turin, Italy. 

Norway entered 29 athletes in the following sports:

Alpine skiing: 2 male
Ice sledge hockey: 14 male
Nordic skiing: 7 male, 1 female
Wheelchair curling: 4 male, 1 female

Medalists

See also

2006 Winter Paralympics
Norway at the 2006 Winter Olympics

External links
Torino 2006 Paralympic Games
International Paralympic Committee
Norges Funksjonshemmedes Idrettsforbund

2006
Nations at the 2006 Winter Paralympics
Winter Paralympics